Abdul Mannan Mandal (-7 June 2018) Bangladesh Nationalist Party politician. He was elected a member of parliament from Gaibandha-4 in February 1996.

Early life 
Abdul Mannan Mandal was born in 1953 in Gaibandha District.

Career 
Abdul Mannan Mandal started his political career in 1974 through Chhatra League. After that join Bangladesh Jatiotabadi Chatra Dal. He was the joint secretary of BNP's Gobindaganj Thana in 1988 and the president of Gobindaganj Upazila BNP since 1992–2018.

He was elected to parliament from Gaibandha-4 as a Bangladesh Nationalist Party candidate in 15 February 1996 Bangladeshi general election. He was defeated in the 7th Jatiya Sangsad elections on 12 June 1996 as a candidate of Bangladesh Nationalist Party from Gaibandha-4 constituency.

He was the principal of Hakimpur Degree College in Dinajpur. He was the elected chairman of the Shakhahar Union for five consecutive terms from 1965 to 1982.

Death 
Abdul Mannan Mandal died on 7 June 2018.

References 

1950s births
2018 deaths
People from Gaibandha District
Bangladesh Nationalist Party politicians
6th Jatiya Sangsad members